The Terek barbel (Barbus ciscaucasicus) is a species of ray-finned fish in the genus Barbus which is found in the western drainage basin of the Caspian Sea from the Terek basin to the Samur basin in Dagestan, Georgia and Azerbaijan.

References 

 

ciscaucasicus
Cyprinid fish of Asia
Fish described in 1877